Anthony Melchior Frank (born May 21, 1931) was an American banker and served as the United States Postmaster General from 1988 to 1992.

Early life 
On May 21, 1931, Frank was born in Berlin, Germany. Frank's father was Lothar Frank (1900-1985). Frank's paternal grandfather was Sigismund Frank (1848-1930), a banker. Frank's paternal grandmother was Lina Rothschild (1865-1960). At age 6, he and his family moved from Germany to the United States. Frank attended Hollywood High School.

Education
Frank earned a bachelor's degree from Dartmouth College, and an MBA from the Tuck School of Business at Dartmouth College. He also did postgraduate work in finance at the University of Vienna.

Career 
Frank was the CEO of First Nationwide Bank in San Francisco, California.

In 1988, Frank was appointed as the United States Postmaster General by the Governors of U.S. Postal Service effective March 1, 1988. He resigned the post in 1992.

In 1992, Frank started Independent Bancorp of Arizona, a new financial instition.

Filmography 
 1991 Murder, She Wrote - The Skinny According to Nick Cullhane episode (season 7). The mailman.
 2010 Murder by Proxy: How America Went Postal - as himself, U.S. Postmaster General.

See also 
 List of Murder, She Wrote episodes#Season 7 (1990–91)
 Bruno Frank

References

External links 
 Tony Frank's Varied Career
 
 Lothar Frank (in German)

Living people
1931 births
United States Postmasters General
Jewish emigrants from Nazi Germany to the United States
University of Vienna alumni
Tuck School of Business alumni
Reagan administration personnel
George H. W. Bush administration personnel